Derrick Cawthorne (born 24 April 1931) is a British fencer. He competed in the team foil event at the 1964 Summer Olympics. In 1960, he won the foil title at the British Fencing Championships.

Personal life
His daughter is Hilary Cawthorne.

References

1931 births
Living people
British male fencers
Olympic fencers of Great Britain
Fencers at the 1964 Summer Olympics